Pierre Picco (born 17 October 1988) is a French slalom canoeist who has competed at the international level since 2005 together with Hugo Biso in the C2 class.

He won five medals at the ICF Canoe Slalom World Championships with three golds (C2 team: 2010, 2014, 2015) and two silvers (C2: 2014, 2015). He also won three golds and a silver at the European Championships.

Picco won the overall World Cup title in the C2 category in 2016.

World Cup individual podiums

References

 2010 ICF Canoe Slalom World Championships 11 September 2010 C2 men's team final results. - accessed 11 September 2010.

External links

French male canoeists
Living people
1988 births
Medalists at the ICF Canoe Slalom World Championships